Nicola Jane Spurrier PSM (born 9 December 1966) is an Australian paediatrician and public health physician who has been the Chief Public Health Officer of South Australia since August 2019.

Education
Spurrier graduated with a Bachelor of Medicine, Bachelor of Surgery from the University of Adelaide in 1990. She has a Graduate Diploma in Epidemiology from the University of Newcastle (1997) and completed a PhD from Adelaide University in 1999, with a thesis titled Parental management of children's asthma:the role of psychosocial factors.

Career
Spurrier worked at the Women's and Children's Hospital in Adelaide from 1993 until 1999, before becoming a lecturer in Paediatrics and Child Health at Flinders University and consultant paediatrician at Flinders Medical Centre. In 2011, the University awarded her the status of Associate Professor and in April 2020, Professor. She is qualified as a specialist in both public health and paediatrics.

Spurrier has worked for SA Health for nearly thirty years, developing and implementing programs and policies focused on child health, obesity prevention and Aboriginal health. She is a Fellow of the Royal Australasian College of Physicians and the Australasian Faculty of Public Health Medicine.

Spurrier became Chief Public Health Officer for South Australia in August 2019. Four months later, she was involved in the state's response to bushfires. From March 2020, Spurrier led South Australia's response to the COVID-19 pandemic, giving daily press conferences alongside Premier Steven Marshall in which she was called "calm, honest and direct". She became popular with the public and had a cocktail named after her at Adelaide bar 2KW. Despite her "cult following", she ruled out a move into politics.

Awards and recognition
Spurrier was one of four nominees for 2021 South Australian of the Year. She was awarded a Public Service Medal in the 2021 Queen's Birthday Honours for outstanding public service to community health in South Australia.

In September 2022, a newly discovered species of bacteria was named Nicolia spurrieriana in recognition of Spurrier's work during the Covid pandemic.

Personal life
Spurrier has been married to David Spurrier, a physiotherapist, for thirty years and they have a daughter and two sons. Her mother, sister, and brother in law are all also doctors.

Selected publications

Book

Articles

References

External links
 On the Couch Interview

Living people
People from South Australia
University of Adelaide Medical School alumni
University of Newcastle (Australia) alumni
Academic staff of Flinders University
Australian public servants
Australian women medical doctors
Australian medical doctors
Australian women epidemiologists
Australian paediatricians
Women pediatricians
1966 births